Belozersk, known as Beloozero until 1777, is a town and the administrative center of Belozersky District in Vologda Oblast, Russia, located on the southern bank of Lake Beloye, from which it takes the name,  northwest of Vologda, the administrative center of the oblast. Population:

History
Known as Beloozero until 1777, it was first chronicled in 862 as one of the five original Russian towns (the other four being Murom, Novgorod, Polotsk, and Rostov). According to the Primary Chronicle, Sineus, a brother of Rurik, became the prince of Beloozero in 862. However, Sineus most likely never existed. On several occasions, the settlement was moved from one bank of the lake to another.

In the 11th century, the region was still inhabited primarily by Finnic peoples tribes who fiercely resisted Christianization. In 1071, local pagan priests rose in rebellion, which was put down by the Kievan commander Yan Vyshatich. The Primary Chronicle reports that the dead bodies of priests were suspended from an oak tree, until they were torn to pieces by a bear (regarded by pagans as a holy animal). From the 10th to the 13th centuries, the territory was controlled by the Novgorod Republic. Beloozero was the seat of a small principality between 1238 and the 1370s, but subsequently between 1380 and 1384 became subordinate to the Grand Duchy of Moscow. On July 10, 1612, Polish and Lithuanian vagabonds (Lisowczycy) captured Belozersk without a fight, looting the town.

In the course of the administrative reform carried out in 1708 by Peter the Great, Beloozero was included into Ingermanland Governorate (known since 1710 as Saint Petersburg Governorate) and named one of the towns constituting the governorate. In 1727, a separate Novgorod Governorate was split off and Belozersk became the seat of Belozersk Province in Novgorod Governorate. In 1776, the territory was transferred to Novgorod Viceroyalty. In 1796, the viceroyalty was abolished and Belozersky Uyezd became a part of Novgorod Governorate.

In June 1918, five uyezds of Novgorod Governorate, including Belozersky Uyezd, were split off to form Cherepovets Governorate, with the administrative center in Cherepovets. On August 1, 1927, Cherepovets Governorate was abolished and its territory became Cherepovets Okrug of Leningrad Oblast. At the same time, uyezds were abolished and Belozersky District was established. On September 23, 1937, Belozersky District was transferred to newly established Vologda Oblast.

Administrative and municipal status
Within the framework of administrative divisions, Belozersk serves as the administrative center of Belozersky District. As an administrative division, it is incorporated within Belozersky District as the town of district significance of Belozersk.

As a municipal division, the town of district significance of Belozersk, together with four rural localities in Glushkovsky Selsoviet and two rural localities in Kunostsky Selsoviet of Belozersky District, is incorporated within Belozersky Municipal District as Belozersk Urban Settlement.

Climate
Winters are cold but not severe by Russian standards for areas north of the 60th parallel.

Economy

Industry
The economy of Belozersk is based on the timber and food industries.

Transportation
Belozersk is connected by all-seasonal roads with Cherepovets, Kirillov, and Lipin Bor (connecting further to Vytegra). There are also local roads.

The Belozersky Canal, a part of the Volga–Baltic Waterway (formerly known as the Mariinsk Canal System), which connects the river courses of the Sheksna and the Kovzha, runs through Belozersk, bypassing Lake Beloye from the south.

Culture and recreation
The town of Belozersk is classified as a historical town by the Ministry of Culture of Russia, which implies certain restrictions on construction in the historical center.

The medieval monuments in the town center are the Assumption Church (1552) and the Transfiguration Cathedral (1668). The wooden shrine of St. Elijah was built in 1690. The neighborhood is rich in old cloisters, such as Kirillo-Belozersky and Ferapontov Monasteries.

Two of the most famous medieval icons were created in the 13th century in Belozersk: the Virgin of the White Lake and Saints Peter and Paul. They constitute an intermediate style between Novgorodian and Northern icon painting.

The Belozersky Local Museum located in Belozersk is an umbrella organization which not only hosts ethnographic and historical exhibits, but also manages the most important architectural monuments in Belozersk such as the Transfiguration Cathedral.

See also
Northern Thebaid

References

Notes

Sources

Bibliography
 .

External links
Official website of Belozersk 
Belozersk Business Directory 

Cities and towns in Vologda Oblast
Belozersky District, Vologda Oblast
Belozersky Uyezd